Punjab Police may refer to:

 Punjab Police (India), which operates in the Indian state of Punjab
 Punjab Police (Pakistan), which operates in the Pakistani province of Punjab
 FC Punjab Police, an Indian association football club